The ICC Women's Cricket World Cup Qualifier is an international cricket tournament that serves as the final step of the qualification process for the Women's Cricket World Cup.

The Women's World Cup was first held in 1973, and for the first seven editions participation was determined solely by invitation, issued at the discretion of the International Women's Cricket Council (IWCC). A qualification tournament was first held in 2003 (for the 2005 World Cup), which was hosted by the Netherlands and won by Ireland. Three subsequent tournaments have been held – in 2008, hosted by South Africa and won by Pakistan; in 2011, hosted by Bangladesh and won by the West Indies; and in 2017, hosted by Sri Lanka and won by India.

The inaugural event in 2003 was organised by the IWCC and branded as the IWCC Trophy. The IWCC was subsumed by the International Cricket Council (ICC) in 2005, and all other editions have been known simply as the World Cup Qualifier. The number of teams and qualifying places has varied at each tournament – in 2003, six teams competed for two qualifying spots, while at the next edition (in 2008) eight teams contested two qualifying spots. The 2011 event saw ten teams compete for three qualifying places, and the 2017 tournament featured ten teams and four qualifying places.

Results

Performance by team
Legend
 – Champions
 – Runners-up
 – Third place
Q – Qualified
§ – Team qualified for tournament, but withdrew or disqualified later
× – Did not participate, already qualified for World Cup
    — Hosts
Teams that qualified for the World Cup in a particular year are underlined

See also
 Cricket World Cup Qualifier (men's)
 Women's World Twenty20 Qualifier

References

 
Qualifier
International Cricket Council events
Women's One Day International cricket competitions